Uhlenbach is a small river located in the northeastern region of the German state of North Rhine-Westphalia. It is a  tributary of the Werre river, and part of the Weser River's river system. The Uhlenbach drains water from the Ravensberg Hills.

See also
List of rivers of North Rhine-Westphalia

References

Rivers of North Rhine-Westphalia
Rivers of Germany